According to Dagobert D. Runes, Dictionary of Philosophy, 1942, theistic personalism is "the theory most generally held by Personalists that God is the ground of all being, immanent in and transcendent over the whole world of reality. It is pan-psychic but avoids pantheism by asserting the complementary nature of immanence and transcendence which come together in and are in some degree essential to all personality. The term is used for the modern form of theism. Immanence and transcendence are the contrapletes of personality."

See also
 Personal god

References

Theism
Panpsychism
Personhood
Personality